Slevin's worm lizard (Amphisbaena slevini) is a species of amphisbaenian in the family Amphisbaenidae. The species is endemic to northern South America.

Etymology
The specific name, slevini, is in honor of American herpetologist Joseph Richard Slevin.

Geographic range
A. sleveni is found in Brazil (Amazonas state) and French Guiana.

Habitat
The preferred habitat of A. slevini is forest.

Description
A. slevini is a uniform light brownish color.

Reproduction
A. slevini is oviparous.

References

Further reading
Gans C (1963). "Notes on Amphisbaenids (Amphisbaenia, Reptilia). 7. Redescription and Redefinition of Amphisbaena mitchelli Procter and Amphisbaena slevini Schmidt from the Middle and Lower Amazon, Brazil". American Museum Novitates (2127): 1-22. (Amphisbaena slevini, pp. 14-21 + Figures 8–14).
Gans C (2005). "Checklist and Bibliography of the Amphisbaenia of the World". Bulletin of the American Museum of Natural History (289): 1–130. (Amphisbaena slevini, p. 20).
Schmidt KP (1936). "Notes on Brazilian Amphisbaenians". Herpetologica 1 (1): 28–32. (Amphisbaena slevini, new species).
Vanzolini PE (2002). "An aid to the identification of the South American species of Amphisbaena (Squamata, Amphisbaenidae)". Papéis Avulsos de Zoologia, Museu de Zoologia da Universidade de São Paulo 42 (15). 351–362).

Amphisbaena (lizard)
Reptiles described in 1936
Taxa named by Karl Patterson Schmidt